Gustavo Domingo Quinteros Desabato (born 15 February 1965) is a football manager and former professional player who played as a defender. He is the current manager of Chilean club Colo-Colo. Born in Argentina, he played for the 
Bolivia national team.

Playing career

Club
His clubs as a player include The Strongest and San José in Bolivia. He also played for San Lorenzo de Almagro, Argentinos Juniors and Talleres de Remedios de Escalada in his native Argentina.

International
The defender played 26 international matches and scored once for the Bolivia national team, including two appearances in the 1994 FIFA World Cup. His only goal came in a friendly match against Honduras on January 29, 1993, when he opened the score in the 3–1 in the Estadio Felix Capriles, Cochabamba.

Managerial career

After retiring as a player, Quinteros became a manager at San Lorenzo's youth academy. In 2003, he had a brief spell as first team manager. In 2005, he managed the Bolivian Club Blooming and they took a national title, his first Aerosur Cup. Due to his notorious success, he took on management of the Argentine San Martín de San Juan in the Primera B Nacional.

In 2007, Quinteros returned to Blooming, the institution where he built up his coaching reputation and became an idol. The following year he won the Aerosur Cup for the second time in his managerial career and guided the team back to the championship finals; however, they lost to Aurora on penalty kicks (3–4) after a draw during regulation time in a decisive third match played at Sucre's Estadio Patria.

By January 2009 when his contract expired Quinteros decided to move on, and took over La Paz club Bolívar, where he won the Aerosur Cup and the Apertura title. Due to some disparities with the president, Quinteros left the club at the end of the year. By January 2010 he was in charge of Oriente Petrolero. During his stint at Oriente his success continued taking the team to an Aerosur Cup and the Clausura 2010 title.

On 5 November 2010, Quinteros was named the new manager of the Bolivia national team. On 3 July 2012, he presented his letter of resignation and called a press conference to announce his imminent departure from the national team.

On 9 July 2012, Quinteros was formally introduced as the new manager for Ecuadorian club Emelec.  After a stint in the Middle East, and a lacklustre season in Tijuana, he became manager of Colo Colo.

Managerial statistics

References

External links

Gustavo Quinteros – Argentine Primera statistics at Fútbol XXI  

1965 births
Living people
Footballers from Santa Fe, Argentina
Bolivian footballers
Bolivia international footballers
Argentine footballers
Bolivian people of Argentine descent
Sportspeople of Argentine descent
Argentine emigrants to Bolivia
Naturalized citizens of Bolivia
Association football defenders
Newell's Old Boys footballers
Talleres de Remedios de Escalada footballers
Universitario de Sucre footballers
The Strongest players
Club San José players
San Lorenzo de Almagro footballers
Argentinos Juniors footballers
C.D. Jorge Wilstermann players
Argentine Primera División players
1993 Copa América players
1995 Copa América players
1999 Copa América players
1994 FIFA World Cup players
1999 FIFA Confederations Cup players
Bolivian football managers
Argentine football managers
Bolivian expatriate football managers
Argentine expatriate football managers
2011 Copa América managers
2015 Copa América managers
Copa América Centenario managers
San Lorenzo de Almagro managers
Club Blooming managers
San Martín de San Juan managers
Club Bolívar managers
Oriente Petrolero managers
Bolivia national football team managers
C.S. Emelec managers
Ecuador national football team managers
Al Nassr FC managers
Al-Wasl F.C. managers
Club Deportivo Universidad Católica managers
Club Tijuana managers
Colo-Colo managers
Argentine Primera División managers
Bolivian Primera División managers
Primera B Nacional managers
Saudi Professional League managers
UAE Pro League managers
Chilean Primera División managers
Liga MX managers
Expatriate football managers in Argentina
Expatriate football managers in Bolivia
Expatriate football managers in Ecuador
Argentine expatriate sportspeople in Ecuador
Bolivian expatriate sportspeople in Ecuador
Expatriate football managers in Saudi Arabia
Argentine expatriate sportspeople in Saudi Arabia
Bolivian expatriate sportspeople in Saudi Arabia
Argentine expatriate sportspeople in the United Arab Emirates
Expatriate football managers in Chile
Argentine expatriate sportspeople in Chile
Bolivian expatriate sportspeople in Chile